The Clarke River in Westland District is the southernmost of three rivers thus-named in the South Island of New Zealand.
It is a major tributary of the Haast River, flowing southwest from its source on the slopes of Mount Hooker before joining with the Landsborough River three kilometres before the waters of both flow into the Haast at the point where the latter river turns west towards its outflow into the Tasman Sea.

References
 New Zealand 1:50,000 Topographic Map Series, sheet BY13 - Lake Paringa
 New Zealand 1:50,000 Topographic Map Series, sheet BY14 - Mount Ward

Rivers of the West Coast, New Zealand
Westland District
Rivers of New Zealand